Nosworthy is a surname. Notable people with the surname include:

David Nosworthy (born 1967), New Zealand cricket coach
Leo Nosworthy (1927–2021), Australian rugby league footballer
Nyron Nosworthy (born 1980), English football player
William Nosworthy (1867–1946), New Zealand politician